The 2006 Canary Foundation Grand Prix of San Jose was the ninth round of the 2006 Bridgestone Presents the Champ Car World Series Powered by Ford season, held on July 30, 2006 on the streets of San Jose, California.  Sébastien Bourdais dominated the weekend, taking the pole, fastest lap and race win.  Finishing second was 2002 CART champion Cristiano da Matta in what turned out to be his final Champ Car event. On August 3 da Matta was severely injured while testing at Road America in Elkhart Lake, Wisconsin when he collided with a deer on the track.  While da Matta recovered to return to racing in 2008, competing in the Rolex Sports Car Series, he has not competed in open wheel racing since.  The race is also notable for a shoving match between Canadians Paul Tracy and Alex Tagliani in the pits after Tracy crashed into Tagliani while trying to return to the race course from an escape road, ending both their races.

Qualifying results

Race

* Paul Tracy was penalized 7 points and fined an undisclosed amount for causing avoidable contact and bringing the sport into disrepute for his part in the accident and subsequent shoving match with Alex Tagliani. He was also placed on probation for the following 3 races (Denver, Montreal and Road America). Tagliani was also fined an undisclosed amount.

Caution flags

Notes

 New Track Record Sébastien Bourdais 48.989 (Qualification Session #2)
 New Race Lap Record Sébastien Bourdais 49.678
 New Race Record Sébastien Bourdais 1:38:00.168
 Average Speed 85.694 mph

Championship standings after the race

Drivers' Championship standings

 Note: Only the top five positions are included.

References

External links
 Friday Qualifying Results 
 Saturday Qualifying Results 
 Race Results
 Da Matta Injured in Collision With Deer 
 Post Race Penalties 

Canary Foundation Grand Prix of San Jose
San Jose
Sports in San Jose, California